Libina is a municipality and village in Šumperk District in the Olomouc Region of the Czech Republic. It has about 3,200 inhabitants.

Administrative parts
Villages of Dolní Libina and Obědné are administrative parts of Libina.

Geography
The municipal territory lies mostly in the Hanušovice Highlands, however, the built-up area is located in the northernmost tip of the Upper Morava Valley.

History
Libina was probably founded in the second half of 13th century. The first written mentioned of Libina is from 1358.

Sights
The monuments of the municipality include the Church of St. George, Chapel of St. Anthony of Padua in Dolní Libina, and the Neorenaissance building of Langer's villa.

Notable people
Jaroslav Erik Frič (1949–2019), poet, writer and publisher

References

External links

Villages in Šumperk District